The 2008 Wales rugby union tour of South Africa was a series of matches played in June 2008 in South Africa by Wales national rugby union team. Wales lost both tests.

Results

First test

Second test

2008 rugby union tours
2007–08 in Welsh rugby union
2008 in South African rugby union
2008
2008
History of rugby union matches between South Africa and Wales